WKSK is an AM radio station in West Jefferson, North Carolina. It is operated by Caddell Broadcasting, Inc., and broadcasts on a frequency of 580 kHz and, as of June 2014, simulcast on 93.5 MHz in FM stereo. Its 5,000-watt AM signal covers Ashe County, North Carolina and extends into neighboring Watauga, Wilkes and Alleghany counties in North Carolina, Grayson County, Virginia and Johnson County, Tennessee.

The station's slogan is "Today's Country, Yesterday's Favorites."

WKSK's studios and transmitter are located off NC 194, on a hill overlooking West Jefferson that local residents have dubbed "radio hill." WKSK originally was licensed to broadcast only from sunrise to sunset. It now has authority to broadcast at night on a reduced signal, though its post-7 p.m. broadcasts are restricted to coverage of local high school football and basketball games. Most hours begin with ABC News Radio

History
WKSK went on the air in 1959, at 1600 kHz and with only a signal of 500 watts. In the 1980s the station had the opportunity to increase its signal strength to 1,000 watts, which required changing its frequency to 580 kHz. In 2001 signal strength was raised again, to its present level of 5,000 watts.

In the 1960s, WKSK carried an eclectic mix of programming of gospel, country and pop music. From 3-5 p.m. each weekday the station aired the teen-oriented K-Club, featuring the latest hits of Herman's Hermits, the Dave Clark Five, Peter and Gordon and other pop groups of that decade. At 5 p.m. the station aired Our Best To You, a selection of easy listening music. Our Best To You continued until the station's sign-off, which in the winter months would be as early as 5:15 p.m.

In the 1970s and 1980s the station migrated to its current all-country format. WKSK still broadcasts a daily program of gospel music, daily obituary reports, and locally produced religious programs on Sunday mornings.

In 2008, US Congresswoman Virginia Foxx honored WKSK for its service to Ashe County, NC in a one-minute speech on the floor of the United States House of Representatives.  Her remarks were as follows:

References

External links

Ashe County, North Carolina
KSK